Thorium Wars is a vehicular combat video game developed by 3PM Games and published by Big John Games for Nintendo DS in 2009.

Reception

The game received "average" reviews according to the review aggregation website Metacritic.

Sequel
A sequel called Thorium Wars: Attack of the Skyfighter was released for Nintendo 3DS in 2014-2018.

References

External links
 

2009 video games
DSiWare games
Nintendo DS games
Nintendo DS-only games
Vehicular combat games
Video games developed in the United States